Kumeū is an affluent rural town and suburb of Auckland situated 25 km north-west of the City Centre in New Zealand. State Highway 16 and the North Auckland Line pass through the town. Huapai lies to the west, Riverhead to the north, Whenuapai to the east, and Taupaki to the south.

Governance 
Kumeū is part of the Local Government Rodney Ward of Auckland Council and is part of the Kumeu Subdivision of the Rodney Local Board.

History 
The name Kumeū in Māori language originally referred to the north-east of Taupaki village, to the south of modern-day Kumeū. The name is associated with one of the earliest ancestors of the modern Te Kawerau ā Maki iwi, Te Kauea, who was of the early iwi Tini ō Toi (the people of Toi-te-huatahi). During the battle that preceded the peace accord, a wahine toa (woman warrior) pulled at her breast when calling her warriors to revenge an insult, giving rise to the name "Kume-ū" ("Pull Breast"). The traditional name for where the Kumeū village is found is Waipaki-i-rape.

The area was historically important to Tāmaki Māori, as it formed a section of Te Tōangaroa, the portage linking the Kaipara Harbour with the Waitematā Harbour via the Kumeū River. The area is a part of the traditional rohe of Ngāti Whātua o Kaipara and Te Kawerau ā Maki. In the early 19th century, a small Ngāti Whātua settlement was found at Kumeū, which was seasonally inhabited until the Musket Wars in the 1820s.

During early European settlement, the area was an important transport corridor between the Kaipara Harbour and Waitematā Harbour. In 1875, the Kumeu–Riverhead Section of railway was opened. Isolated from the rail networks of the rest of the Auckland Region, the line linked Kumeū to the Waitematā Harbour south of Riverhead until its closure in 1881. In July 1881, the North Auckland Line linking Auckland to Helensville opened, causing significant growth in the Kumeū area.

After World War I, the district was settled by immigrants from the Dalmatian coast of Croatia, many of whom were part of traditional winegrowing families.

Demographics

Kumeu-Huapai had a population of 3,432 at the 2018 New Zealand census, an increase of 2,022 people (143.4%) since the 2013 census, and an increase of 2,046 people (147.6%) since the 2006 census. There were 1,110 households, comprising 1,698 males and 1,734 females, giving a sex ratio of 0.98 males per female. The median age was 34.9 years (compared with 37.4 years nationally), with 822 people (24.0%) aged under 15 years, 567 (16.5%) aged 15 to 29, 1,689 (49.2%) aged 30 to 64, and 357 (10.4%) aged 65 or older.

Ethnicities were 81.7% European/Pākehā, 8.7% Māori, 3.6% Pacific peoples, 14.5% Asian, and 3.3% other ethnicities. People may identify with more than one ethnicity.

The percentage of people born overseas was 27.6, compared with 27.1% nationally.

Although some people chose not to answer the census's question about religious affiliation, 59.5% had no religion, 28.3% were Christian, 3.4% were Hindu, 0.5% were Muslim, 1.0% were Buddhist and 2.4% had other religions.

Of those at least 15 years old, 639 (24.5%) people had a bachelor's or higher degree, and 315 (12.1%) people had no formal qualifications. The median income was $47,800, compared with $31,800 nationally. 819 people (31.4%) earned over $70,000 compared to 17.2% nationally. The employment status of those at least 15 was that 1,629 (62.4%) people were employed full-time, 318 (12.2%) were part-time, and 57 (2.2%) were unemployed.

Rural surrounds

The rural area had a population of 3,654 at the 2018 New Zealand census, an increase of 339 people (10.2%) since the 2013 census, and an increase of 600 people (19.6%) since the 2006 census. There were 1,122 households, comprising 1,851 males and 1,803 females, giving a sex ratio of 1.03 males per female, with 627 people (17.2%) aged under 15 years, 696 (19.0%) aged 15 to 29, 1,710 (46.8%) aged 30 to 64, and 621 (17.0%) aged 65 or older.

Ethnicities were 84.6% European/Pākehā, 11.5% Māori, 4.3% Pacific peoples, 10.2% Asian, and 1.4% other ethnicities. People may identify with more than one ethnicity.

The percentage of people born overseas was 21.6, compared with 27.1% nationally.

Although some people chose not to answer the census's question about religious affiliation, 56.6% had no religion, 30.9% were Christian, 0.2% had Māori religious beliefs, 2.8% were Hindu, 0.7% were Muslim, 0.4% were Buddhist and 2.1% had other religions.

Of those at least 15 years old, 582 (19.2%) people had a bachelor's or higher degree, and 510 (16.8%) people had no formal qualifications. 672 people (22.2%) earned over $70,000 compared to 17.2% nationally. The employment status of those at least 15 was that 1,578 (52.1%) people were employed full-time, 516 (17.0%) were part-time, and 63 (2.1%) were unemployed.

Economy 
Areas surrounding the Kumeū district produce labels such as Kumeu River, Cooper's Creek and Soljans Estate Winery have gained a good reputation for their Chardonnay and Sauvignon blanc wines. The winegrowing district is the main industry in both Kumeū itself and the smaller nearby settlements of Huapai and Waimauku.
 Kumeu River Wines, established in 1944.
 Coopers Creek, established in 1980.
 Landmark Estate, founded in 1937.
 Matua Valley, established in 1966. Matua Valley closed its doors in 2016.
 Nobilos was established in 1943 by Nikola Nobilo and remained family owned until the late 1990s. Now known as Nobilo Wine Group, the company is New Zealand's second largest wine company.
 Soljans Estate Winery was established in 1932 in Henderson, West Auckland. As the company grew they later moved to Kumeū in 2002 

The township is in the North West Country Inc business improvement district zone. The business association which represents businesses from Kaukapakapa to Riverhead.

Activities
The area is popular for lifestyle block farming and equestrian pursuits. The nearby localities of Woodhill forest and Muriwai Beach means it has strong recreational interests.

Music 
Since 1948 Kumeū has had a brass band, competing in many events, and playing in parades, concerts & private Functions, traditional & modern music for all occasions.

The Kumeu Showgrounds are also the venue for the annual Auckland Folk Festival, a 4-day event of music, dancing and workshops, now in its 46th year. The festival is generally held over the last weekend in January.

Transport 
The railway network's North Auckland Line passes through Kumeū. For six years the town was the terminus of the isolated Kumeu-Riverhead Section railway, which linked Kumeū to Riverhead, where ferries ran to Auckland. It operated from 1875 until 1881. In 1881, the North Auckland Line reached Kumeū, making the town a railway junction. This status lasted a mere five days; the new railway from Auckland made the line to Riverhead redundant and it was accordingly closed.

In June 2007 it was announced that suburban rail services would be extended to Helensville in 2008, with temporary stations to be built at Huapai and Waimauku. The service commenced on 14 July 2008 for a one-year trial period, and was then suspended permanently in 2009.

Education
Huapai District School opened in 1919. Matua Ngaru opened in 2019.

The majority of high-school-aged students attend schools in surrounding suburbs. The closest secondary schools are Kaipara College, Massey High School, Liston College, Albany Junior High School and St Dominic's College.

Kumeu Library is based at Huapai. Since the amalgamation of Auckland Council in 2010, Kumeu Library became a branch of Auckland Libraries. In July 2021, Huapai Service Centre was absorbed into the Library to form the Kumeū Library and council services.

Place names
In 2019, the name of the town was officially gazetted as Kumeū, although it is common to see it spelled without the macron.

Māori place names:
 Huapai – good fruit
 Kumeū – pulling the breast (action used to incite a war party)
 Muriwai – backwater or junction of streams

References

External links 
 Kumeu District – The Fruit Bowl of Auckland
 History of Henderson pdf
 Kumeu Community portal
 Hare Krishna School website

Rodney Local Board Area
Populated places in the Auckland Region
Wine regions of New Zealand
West Auckland, New Zealand